D. Vernon may refer to:

 Dai Vernon (1894–1992), Canadian magician
 David Vernon (professor) (born 1958), artificial intelligence researcher
 David Vernon (writer) (born 1965), Australian writer
 Di Vernon